The Half Moon Bay Review is an American online news source and broadsheet newspaper that has been serving the Coastside area of San Mateo County, California, from Pacifica to the Santa Cruz County line since 1898. It is published each Wednesday morning and circulated by mail, counter, and rack sales to homes and businesses on the Coastside. The Review also publishes free magazines throughout the Bay Area, including On The Coastside, Neighborhoods, Coastside Guide, Readers Choice, and Eat.

In October 2020, the Pacifica Tribune was purchased by the Coastside News Group.  The Pacifica Tribune is separately published, and has its own reporters, although some articles are printed in both papers.

The Review is owned by Coastside News Group, Inc., a California Benefit Corporation created by a group of community members. Wick Communications had purchased the Half Moon Bay Review in 1986. They announced plans to sell the newspaper in September 2017. A group of community members, calling themselves the Coastside News Group, entered into an agreement to purchase the paper from Wick in February 2018, and the purchase was completed in June 2018.

References

External links
 Half Moon Bay Review
 Pacifica Tribune

Half Moon Bay, California
Newspapers published in the San Francisco Bay Area
Wick Communications publications
Publications established in 1898
1898 establishments in California
Public benefit corporations based in California
Weekly newspapers published in California